Mihir Bellare is a cryptographer and professor at the University of California San Diego. He holds a Bachelor of Science degree from Caltech and a Ph.D. from Massachusetts Institute of Technology. He has published several seminal papers in the field of cryptography (notably in the area of provable security), many of which were co-written with Phillip Rogaway. Bellare has published a number of papers in the field of Format-Preserving Encryption.  His students include Michel Abdalla, Chanathip Namprempre, Tadayoshi Kohno and Anton Mityagin. Bellare is one of the authors of skein.

In 2003 Bellare was a recipient of RSA Conference's Sixth Annual Award for outstanding contributions in the field of mathematics for his research in cryptography. In 2013 he became a Fellow of the Association for Computing Machinery. In 2019 he was awarded Levchin Prize for Real-World Cryptography for his outstanding contributions to the design and analysis of real-world cryptosystems, including the development of random oracle model, modes of operation, HMAC, and models for key exchange.

Bellare's papers cover topics including:
HMAC
Random oracle
OAEP
Probabilistic signature scheme
Provable security
Format-preserving encryption

On September 14, 2022, Bellare was appointed by the Mayor of San Diego to the city's Privacy Advisory Board.

References

External links
Mihir Bellare
DBLP papers

Modern cryptographers
Public-key cryptographers
University of California, San Diego faculty
Living people
Fellows of the Association for Computing Machinery
International Association for Cryptologic Research fellows
Year of birth missing (living people)